Cephalonomia is a genus of parasitoid wasps in the family Bethylidae. There are more than 20 described species in Cephalonomia.

Species
These 27 species belong to the genus Cephalonomia:

 Cephalonomia benoiti Guiglia, 1956
 Cephalonomia brevipennis Kieffer, 1906
 Cephalonomia cursor Westwood, 1881
 Cephalonomia floridana Ashmead
 Cephalonomia formiciformis Westwood, 1833
 Cephalonomia gallicola (Ashmead, 1887)
 Cephalonomia hammi Richards, 1939
 Cephalonomia hirticollis Ashmead
 Cephalonomia hyalinipennis Ashmead, 1893
 Cephalonomia hypobori Kieffer, 1919
 Cephalonomia kiefferi Fouts
 Cephalonomia macrocephala Evans
 Cephalonomia maculata Maneval, 1935
 Cephalonomia mycetophila Kieffer, 1906
 Cephalonomia nidicola Szelenyi, 1944
 Cephalonomia nigrescens Kieffer, 1906
 Cephalonomia nigriventris Masi, 1933
 Cephalonomia nubilipennis Ashmead
 Cephalonomia peregrina Westwood, 1881
 Cephalonomia pinkfloydi Ward, 2013
 Cephalonomia pontina Cerruti, 1957
 Cephalonomia rufa Kieffer, 1906
 Cephalonomia stephanoderis Betrem, 1961
 Cephalonomia tarsalis (Ashmead, 1893)
 Cephalonomia unicolor Fouts, 1935
 Cephalonomia venata Richards, 1939
 Cephalonomia waterstoni Gahan (parasitic grain wasp)

References

Parasitic wasps
Articles created by Qbugbot
Chrysidoidea